Vihanti was a municipality of Finland. It was merged with the city of Raahe on 1 January 2013.

Vihanti is located in the Northern Ostrobothnia region. The municipality has a population of 
which 
is water. The population density is
.

Vihanti is home of the heavy rock band "Gobra". The original line-up was all-Vihantian, but the current one includes also outsiders. The band has a rehearsal facilities in the Lampinsaari village.

The great dance hall in Mäntylampi was the biggest one in the whole province during the 1970s but is now used only a couple of times per year. The Mäntylampi camping area has not been well kept.

The municipality is unilingually Finnish.

References

External links

Municipality of Vihanti – Official website 

Municipalities of North Ostrobothnia
Populated places established in 1865